3752 Camillo is an inclined contact-binary asteroid, classified as near-Earth object of the Apollo group, approximately  in diameter. It was discovered on 15 August 1985, by astronomers Eleanor Helin and Maria Barucci using a  telescope at the CERGA Observatory in Caussols, France. Lightcurve studies by Petr Pravec in 1998 suggest that the assumed S-type asteroid has an elongated shape and a longer-than average rotation period of 38 hours.

Orbit 

Camillo orbits the Sun at a distance of 0.99–1.8 AU once every 20 months (614 days; semi-major axis of 1.41 AU). Its orbit has an eccentricity of 0.30 and an inclination of 56° with respect to the ecliptic.

Close approaches 

The closest point between the orbit of the Earth and the orbit of this asteroid (Earth MOID) is currently  or 30 lunar distances, so Camillo does not come close enough to Earth to qualify as a potentially hazardous asteroid. It came to perihelion (its closest approach to the Sun) on 6 January 1976 and, on 17 February 1976 and passed within  of Earth.

2013 passage 

Camillo came to perihelion on 27 December 2012. On 12 February 2013 the asteroid passed  from Earth and had an apparent magnitude of 13. During the 2013 passage the asteroid was studied by radar using Goldstone and Arecibo.

2018 passage 

On February 20, 2018, the asteroid passed by Earth. It was observed on radar by Arecibo Observatory and shown to have a long angular double-lobed shape. At  distance its peak magnitude was about 13.

Naming 

This minor planet was named for the son of the early Roman King Turno. "Camillo" is also the name of the discoverer's son. The official naming citation was published by the Minor Planet Center on 20 May 1989.

References

External links 
 Asteroid Lightcurve Database (LCDB), query form (info )
 Dictionary of Minor Planet Names, Google books
 Asteroids and comets rotation curves, CdR – Observatoire de Genève, Raoul Behrend
 
 
 

003752
Discoveries by Eleanor F. Helin
Discoveries by Maria A. Barucci
Named minor planets
003752
19850815